This is a list of electoral division results for the Australian 1996 federal election in the state of New South Wales.

Overall results

Results by division

Banks 
 This section is an excerpt from Electoral results for the Division of Banks § 1996

Barton 
 This section is an excerpt from Electoral results for the Division of Barton § 1996

Bennelong 
 This section is an excerpt from Electoral results for the Division of Bennelong § 1996

Berowra 
 This section is an excerpt from Electoral results for the Division of Berowra § 1996

Blaxland 
 This section is an excerpt from Electoral results for the Division of Blaxland § 1996

Bradfield 
 This section is an excerpt from Electoral results for the Division of Bradfield § 1996

Calare 
 This section is an excerpt from Electoral results for the Division of Calare § 1996

Charlton 
 This section is an excerpt from Electoral results for the Division of Charlton § 1996

Chifley 
 This section is an excerpt from Electoral results for the Division of Chifley § 1996

Cook 
 This section is an excerpt from Electoral results for the Division of Cook § 1996

Cowper 
 This section is an excerpt from Electoral results for the Division of Cowper § 1996

Cunningham 
 This section is an excerpt from Electoral results for the Division of Cunningham § 1996

Dobell 
 This section is an excerpt from Electoral results for the Division of Dobell § 1996

Eden-Monaro 
 This section is an excerpt from Electoral results for the Division of Eden-Monaro § 1996

Farrer 
 This section is an excerpt from Electoral results for the Division of Farrer § 1996

Fowler 
 This section is an excerpt from Electoral results for the Division of Fowler § 1996

Gilmore 
 This section is an excerpt from Electoral results for the Division of Gilmore § 1996

Grayndler 
 This section is an excerpt from Electoral results for the Division of Grayndler § 1996

Greenway 
 This section is an excerpt from Electoral results for the Division of Greenway § 1996

Gwydir 
 This section is an excerpt from Electoral results for the Division of Gwydir § 1996

Hughes 
 This section is an excerpt from Electoral results for the Division of Hughes § 1996

Hume 
 This section is an excerpt from Electoral results for the Division of Hume § 1996

Hunter 
 This section is an excerpt from Electoral results for the Division of Hunter § 1996

Kingsford Smith 
 This section is an excerpt from Electoral results for the Division of Kingsford Smith § 1996

Lindsay 
 This section is an excerpt from Electoral results for the Division of Lindsay § 1996

Lowe 
 This section is an excerpt from Electoral results for the Division of Lowe § 1996

Lyne 
 This section is an excerpt from Electoral results for the Division of Lyne § 1996

Macarthur 
 This section is an excerpt from Electoral results for the Division of Macarthur § 1996

Mackellar 
 This section is an excerpt from Electoral results for the Division of Mackellar § 1996

Macquarie 
 This section is an excerpt from Electoral results for the Division of Macquarie § 1996

Mitchell 
 This section is an excerpt from Electoral results for the Division of Mitchell § 1996

New England 
 This section is an excerpt from Electoral results for the Division of New England § 1996

Newcastle 
 This section is an excerpt from Electoral results for the Division of Newcastle § 1996

North Sydney 
 This section is an excerpt from Electoral results for the Division of North Sydney § 1996

Page 
 This section is an excerpt from Electoral results for the Division of Page § 1996

Parkes 
 This section is an excerpt from Electoral results for the Division of Parkes § 1996

Parramatta 
 This section is an excerpt from Electoral results for the Division of Parramatta § 1996

Paterson 
 This section is an excerpt from Electoral results for the Division of Paterson § 1996

Prospect 
 This section is an excerpt from Electoral results for the Division of Prospect § 1996

Reid 
 This section is an excerpt from Electoral results for the Division of Reid § 1996

Richmond 
 This section is an excerpt from Electoral results for the Division of Richmond § 1996

Riverina 
 This section is an excerpt from Electoral results for the Division of Riverina § 1996

Robertson 
 This section is an excerpt from Electoral results for the Division of Robertson § 1996

Shortland 
 This section is an excerpt from Electoral results for the Division of Shortland § 1996

Sydney 
 This section is an excerpt from Electoral results for the Division of Sydney § 1996

Throsby 
 This section is an excerpt from Electoral results for the Division of Throwsby § 1996

Warringah 
 This section is an excerpt from Electoral results for the Division of Warringah § 1996

Watson 
 This section is an excerpt from Electoral results for the Division of Watson § 1996

Wentworth 
 This section is an excerpt from Electoral results for the Division of Wentworth § 1996

Werriwa 
 This section is an excerpt from Electoral results for the Division of Werriwa § 1996

See also 

 Members of the Australian House of Representatives, 1996–1998

References 

New South Wales 1996